Nikolai Andreevich Bodisko (23 September 1756 – 1 November 1815) was a Russian counter admiral.

Bodisko participated in the wars against Napoleonic France before the Treaties of Tilsit in 1807. During the Finnish War he commanded the Russian forces that landed on Gotland on 22 April 1808 and occupied the island. When a Swedish naval force under counter admiral Rudolf Cederström arrived on 16 May, the Russian situation became hopeless. Bodisko capitulated and the Russian forces returned home. This was not appreciated by emperor Alexander I who exiled Bodisko to Vologda. Bodisko was eventually pardoned by the emperor and became commander of the Sveaborg fortress (today Suomenlinna) at Helsinki.

References

External links 
 (tyska) Genealogisches Handbuch der baltischen Ritterschaften Estland - Bodisco nobility in the Estonia

1815 deaths
1756 births
Military personnel from Saint Petersburg
Russian commanders of the Napoleonic Wars
Imperial Russian Navy admirals
Russian military personnel of the Finnish War
Recipients of Russian royal pardons